Action Balance and Transparence (Action Équilibre et Transparence) is a political party in Saint Barthélemy, led by Maxime Desouches. It won in the 1 July 2007 Territorial Council elections 1 out of 19 seats.

Political parties in Saint Barthélemy